Curtis Holt may refer to:
 Curtis Holt (Arrowverse), a character in the Arrow television series based on the character Mister Terrific.
 Curtis J. Holt Sr., a civil rights and public housing activist from Richmond, Virginia.
 Fifth Street Viaduct, officially known as the Curtis Holt Sr. Bridge